Lori McNeil was a defending champion at the time but was beaten in the 1993 semifinals by Miriam Oremans, 7–6, 7–6.

Martina Navratilova won in the final 2–6, 6–2, 6–3 against Oremans.

Seeds
A champion seed is indicated in bold text while text in italics indicates the round in which that seed was eliminated.

  Martina Navratilova (champion)
  Gabriela Sabatini (third round)
  Mary Jo Fernandez (second round)
  Helena Suková (quarterfinals)
  Nathalie Tauziat (quarterfinals)
 n/a
  Naoko Sawamatsu (third round)
  Kimiko Date (third round)
  Natalia Zvereva (second round)
  Lori McNeil (semifinals)
  Nicole Provis (third round)
  Zina Garrison-Jackson (third round)
  Lindsay Davenport (first round)
  Brenda Schultz (third round)
  Patty Fendick (semifinals)
  Pam Shriver (second round)

Draw

Finals

Top half

Section 1

Section 2

Bottom half

Section 3

Section 4

References
 1993 Volkswagen Cup Draw

Singles
1993 WTA Tour